Eustrotiopis is a monotypic moth genus of the family Erebidae. Its only species, Eustrotiopis chlorata, is found in the Democratic Republic of the Congo, Kenya, Tanzania and Uganda. Both the genus and the species were first described by George Hampson in 1926.

References

Calpinae
Monotypic moth genera